Amir Temur Xiyoboni (“Amir Timur Avenue”) is a station of the Tashkent Metro on Chilonzor Line. It is a transfer station to Yunus Rajabiy, Yunusobod Line. The station is named for the square of Amir Timur.

History 
The station was opened on 6 November 1977 It was part of the first section of the Chilanzar line between October inkilobi and Sabir Rakhimov. It was the northern terminus of the inaugural section of Tashkent Metro. Prior to 1 May 1992 it was called "October inkilobi" ( "October Revolution"), before it was renamed "Markaziy xiyoboni" ( "Central Square"). The station received its current name on 1 August 1993. On 31 August 1980 the line was extended further north to Maksim Gor'kiy.

It is a column-type station with two underground vestibules, combined with pedestrian subways.

The design and construction of the station used precast concrete. Floor slabs are hidden behind a false ceiling, lighting fixtures installed in the beams. Facing the station are columns Nuratau white marble. The walls of the tunnel track are Gazgan reddish marble. The Paul station is granite gray and black.

Earlier, the walls of the track tunnel had panels of hammered copper made by sculptors V. Lunev and L. Ryabtsev. Probably because of the revolutionary theme, after independence they were dismantled.

References

Tashkent Metro stations
Railway stations opened in 1977